Rolands Kalniņš (9 May 1922 – 17 May 2022) was a Latvian film director, screenwriter, and producer.

Biography  

Rolands Kalniņš was born on 9 May 1922 in Vecslabada, Istra Parish, Latvia to a post worker family. From 1937 to 1940, he studied at the Riga State Gymnasium No.1. Following World War II, he started working as a director at the Riga Film Studio, instantly from an assistant director to a second director. His films I Remember Everything, Richard and Four White Shirts were pulled from cinemas as they were declared undesirable. 

He won Best Screenplay Award at the Chișinău Film Festival (1967) for his film I Remember Everything, Richard. In 1980, his film Saruna ar karalieni received the Latvian National Film Festival Prize for best documentary, and in 2005 he received an Award for Life Contribution. In 1991, he produced Cilvēka bērns. He turned 100 on 9 May 2022, and died on 17 May.

See also
I Remember Everything, Richard

References

External links

1922 births
2022 deaths
People from Ludza Municipality
Latvian film directors
Soviet film directors
Lielais Kristaps Award winners
Latvian centenarians
Men centenarians